Highway 54 (AR 54, Ark. 54, and Hwy. 54) is a designation for two state highways in Southeast Arkansas. One route of  begins at US 65/US 165 in Dumas and runs west to US 425/Highway 11. A second route of  begins at Highway 114 and runs west to County Road 18 at the Grant/Jefferson county line. Both routes are maintained by the Arkansas Department of Transportation (ARDOT).

Route description

History
Highway 54 was created on April 1, 1926 as one of the original state highways. The route ran east from US 65 in Dumas to State Road 1 entirely within in Desha County. It was extended west to Garrett Bridge in 1937, supplanting a Highway 140 designation. The route was extended west to Little Garnett in July 1957 and Star City in June 1960.

The second route was created in April 1963, beginning at Highway 114 and running north to Highway 15 (present day US 63) in Jefferson County. The route was extended north and west to the Grant county line in November 1966. Though the Arkansas State Highway Commission authorized an extension to Highway 35 at Grapevine, Grant County never satisfied the conditions necessary for extension, and rescinded approval in January 1982.

The original section of Highway 54 was supplanted in March 1981 between Dumas and Highway 1 by an extended US 165.

Major intersections

See also

Notes

References

External links

054
Transportation in Desha County, Arkansas
Transportation in Lincoln County, Arkansas
Transportation in Cleveland County, Arkansas
Transportation in Jefferson County, Arkansas